M. occultus may refer to:
 Mesomys occultus, a rat species
 Mughiphantes occultus, a spider species in the genus Mughiphantes
 Myotis occultus, a bat species

See also
 Occultus (disambiguation)